The Riviere-du-Loup 3L is a professional ice hockey team in the Ligue Nord-Américaine de Hockey (LNAH) based in Rivière-du-Loup, Quebec. The team's first season in the LNAH was 2008–09. The city of Rivière-du-Loup earlier in the decade had teams in the Quebec Semi-Pro Hockey League, Quebec Senior Major Hockey League and Quebec Senior Central Hockey League.

From 2004 to 2010, the team was known as the Rivière-du-Loup CIMT, named after the local TVA affiliate that sponsored the team.

External links
Official website

Ice hockey teams in Quebec
Sport in Rivière-du-Loup
Ligue Nord-Américaine de Hockey teams
2004 establishments in Quebec
Ice hockey clubs established in 2004